Brendan Crawford (born April 16, 1990) is an indoor American football quarterback who is currently a free agent. After jumping around schools Crawford played his final collegiate season at Langston University.

Early life
Crawford graduated from Captain John L. Chapin High School in El Paso, Texas in 2008.

College career
Crawford began his college career at Grambling State University before transferring to Langston University. Also played quarterback at Central Methodist University in Fayette, Missouri.

Professional career
Crawford began his professional career with the Amarillo Venom of the Lone Star Football League (LSFL). After two games with the Venom, Crawford left the team to join the New Mexico Stars. After just two games with the Stars, Crawford left and joined the Wyoming Cavalry of the Indoor Football League (IFL).

Crawford returned to the Venom at the start of the 2014 season. In May 2014, Crawford was assigned to the Tampa Bay Storm of the Arena Football League (AFL).

In September 2015, Crawford signed with the Chicago Eagles.

On April 27, 2016, Crawford signed with the Nebraska Danger. On May 2, 2016, he was released.

On March 1, 2018, Crawford signed with the Texas Revolution. On March 22, 2018, he was released.

References

External links
Arena Football League bio

1990 births
Living people
American football quarterbacks
Langston Lions football players
New Mexico Stars players
Amarillo Venom players
Wyoming Cavalry players
Tampa Bay Storm players
San Angelo Bandits players
Chicago Eagles players
Nebraska Danger players
Texas Revolution players